Clifford Roberts (March 6, 1894 – September 29, 1977) was an American investment dealer and golf administrator.

Early years
Born in Morning Sun, Iowa, Roberts had a financially troubled family life as a boy.  He and older brother, John Darious Roberts, left school before graduation after beating up the school's principal. He worked as a successful, traveling clothing salesman, then as a promoter of speculative oil and gas leases and production. A large commission in the oil and gas industry, made in 1921, provided the financial means to become a Wall Street stock broker. He became a partner at Reynolds & Company in the late 1920s, a position he held for the remainder of his life.

Augusta National Golf Club
In 1932, Roberts and  Bobby Jones co-founded the Augusta National Golf Club in Augusta, Georgia. Roberts served as Chairman of the club from 1931 through 1976.

Two years after its foundation, in 1934, Roberts and Jones started the Masters Tournament (played annually at Augusta National), personally extending invitations to the tournament. Roberts served as Chairman of the Masters Tournament from 1934 through 1976.

Roberts was named "Chairman in Memoriam" after his death. 

Roberts' friendship with President Dwight Eisenhower led to the Eisenhowers making Augusta National their retreat during the 1950s.

Roberts was sometimes described as a "benevolent dictator" and during his tenure he did not hesitate to take swift, stern action against anyone whose words or deeds he believed could tarnish the club's image, no matter how slight. An example of this occurred at the end of the Monday playoff in 1966 when CBS commentator Jack Whitaker referred to the energetic crowd on the 18th fairway following the three players as a "mob" – Whitaker was subsequently banned by Roberts until 1972.

According to The New York Times, another comment attributed to Roberts is: "As long as I'm alive, all the golfers will be white and all the caddies will be black." The club had long-standing policies of hiring only black caddies and requiring their exclusive use at all times, including at the Masters tournament. Masters participants were not permitted to use their own caddies on Augusta National grounds until several years after Roberts' death.

The Masters Tournament, an invitational event, excluded black players for four decades, with Roberts once quoted as saying "to make an exception would be practicing discrimination in reverse." Roberts was finally forced to relax this stance late in his career, and Lee Elder became the first black participant in 1975. In 1997, Tiger Woods became the first person of color to win the tournament.

It was not until 1990, thirteen years after Roberts stepped down as chairman that Augusta National admitted an African American member, Ron Townsend. The first woman, former Secretary of State Condoleezza Rice, was admitted in 2012.

Accolades
Roberts received many awards and honors during his lifetime, including: service on the PGA Advisory Committee from its inception in 1943 until his death, appointment by the United States Golf Association to serve on the Bob Jones Award Selection Committee, and election to the World Golf Hall of Fame in 1978. 

Roberts was the subject of a book titled The Making of the Masters, Clifford Roberts, Augusta National, and Golf's Most Prestigious Tournament by David Owen, published in 1999.

Death
At age 83, Roberts had been in ill health for several months with cancer, and had a debilitating stroke. On September 29, 1977, a year after stepping down, Roberts killed himself via a self-inflicted gunshot on the banks of Ike's Pond at Augusta. His mother, Rebecca Scott Key Roberts, a niece of the author of the US National anthem, Francis Scott Key, had taken her own life by gunshot wound in 1913.

Several weeks later, a bronze plaque in his honor was unveiled at the clubhouse entrance.

References

External links
Official site of The Masters

You Tube – Clifford Roberts interview

Golf administrators
World Golf Hall of Fame inductees
Suicides by firearm in Georgia (U.S. state)
People from Louisa County, Iowa
People from Augusta, Georgia
1894 births
1977 suicides